Cecil Byron "Cebe" Ross (November 22, 1901 – April 2, 1953) was an American football player and coach. He served as the head football coach at West Virginia Wesleyan College in Buckhannon, West Virginia from 1925 to 1941 and 1946 to 1950. Ross died on April 2, 1953, in Buckhannon, West Virginia.

References

External links
 

1901 births
1953 deaths
American football quarterbacks
Basketball coaches from West Virginia
American football halfbacks
Charleston Golden Eagles football coaches
Charleston Golden Eagles men's basketball coaches
West Virginia Wesleyan Bobcats and Lady Bobcats athletic directors
West Virginia Wesleyan Bobcats football coaches
West Virginia Wesleyan Bobcats football players
High school football coaches in West Virginia
Players of American football from West Virginia